The 2023 Canadian U18 Curling Championships were held from February 5 to 11 at the McIntyre Arena and the McIntyre Curling Club in Timmins, Ontario. Timmins was originally scheduled to host the 2021 edition of the event, however, it was cancelled due to the COVID-19 pandemic in Ontario. It was also set to host the 2022 event before it was postponed and later moved to Oakville, Ontario.

This was the fifth edition of the Canadian U18 Curling Championships. The inaugural edition was held in Moncton, New Brunswick in 2017 and was again held in New Brunswick in Saint Andrews in 2018. After the 2019 event in Sherwood Park, Alberta, the U18 nationals were cancelled in 2020 and 2021 due to the COVID-19 pandemic. The event returned in 2022 in Oakville, Ontario with an expanded field of twenty-one teams in each division. The 2023 edition also used this twenty-one-team format, splitting the teams into three pools of seven. The top four teams from each pool at the end of the round robin advanced to the playoff round. Based on results from the 2019 and 2022 events, certain provinces earned two berths to the championship. On both sides, all regions except for Newfoundland and Labrador, Prince Edward Island and the Northwest Territories got a second team.

Medallists

Men

Teams
The teams are listed as follows:

Round-robin standings
Final round-robin standings

Round-robin results

All draw times are listed in Eastern Time (UTC−04:00).

Draw 1
Sunday, February 5, 9:30 am

Draw 3
Sunday, February 5, 7:00 pm

Draw 5
Monday, February 6, 2:00 pm

Draw 7
Tuesday, February 7, 9:30 am

Draw 9
Tuesday, February 7, 6:30 pm

Draw 11
Wednesday, February 8, 2:00 pm

Draw 13
Thursday, February 9, 8:30 am

Playoffs

Qualification games
Thursday, February 9, 4:30 pm

Quarterfinals
Friday, February 10, 8:30 am

Semifinals
Friday, February 10, 4:30 pm

Final
Saturday, February 11, 12:30 pm

Consolation

A Bracket
For Seeds 3 to 8

B Bracket
For Seeds 9 to 12

C Bracket
For Seeds 13 to 15

D Bracket
For Seeds 16 to 18

E Bracket
For Seeds 19 to 21

Final standings

Women

Teams
The teams are listed as follows:

Round-robin standings
Final round-robin standings

Round-robin results

All draw times are listed in Eastern Time (UTC−04:00).

Draw 2
Sunday, February 5, 2:00 pm

Draw 4
Monday, February 6, 9:30 am

Draw 6
Monday, February 6, 6:30 pm

Draw 8
Tuesday, February 7, 2:00 pm

Draw 10
Wednesday, February 8, 9:30 am

Draw 12
Wednesday, February 8, 6:30 pm

Draw 14
Thursday, February 9, 12:30 pm

Playoffs

Qualification games
Thursday, February 9, 8:30 pm

Quarterfinals
Friday, February 10, 12:30 pm

Semifinals
Friday, February 10, 8:30 pm

Final
Saturday, February 11, 4:30 pm

Consolation

A Bracket
For Seeds 3 to 8

B Bracket
For Seeds 9 to 12

C Bracket
For Seeds 13 to 15

D Bracket
For Seeds 16 to 18

E Bracket
For Seeds 19 to 21

Final standings

References

External links
Official Website

2023 in Canadian curling
Curling in Northern Ontario
2023 in Ontario
Sport in Timmins
February 2023 sports events in Canada